Acacia burrowii, commonly known as Burrow's wattle, is a tree belonging to the genus Acacia and the subgenus Juliflorae that is native to eastern Australia.

Description
It has glabrous, scurfy, reddish-brown coloured branchlets that are angular towards the apices. Like most species of Acacia it has phyllodes instead of true leaves. It blooms between July and October producing yellow flowers. The flower-spikes have a length of  packed with golden coloured flowers. The dark brown to black seeds with an oblong-elliptic shape are longitudinally arranged in the pods.

Distribution
It is endemic to north western New South Wales and south eastern Queensland. It is found on the plains around Cobar and Nyngan in the south withit's range extending north through Yetman and the Pilliga Scrub into south eastern Queensland from around Goodiwindi and Moonie, Queensland in the south up to around Eidsvold in the north where it is found in rocky hillsides in loamy or sandy soils as a part of Eucalyptus forest and woodland communities or sometimes dense scrubland.

See also
List of Acacia species

References

burrowii
Flora of Queensland
Flora of New South Wales
Taxa named by Joseph Maiden
Plants described in 1920